Locrian & Christoph Heemann is a collaborative album between drone rock band Locrian and Christoph Heemann. It was released on September 18, 2012 on Handmade Birds.

Track listing

Personnel

André Foisy – electric guitar, 12-string guitar
Terence Hannum – vocals, organ, synthesizer, piano
Steven Hess—drums, tape 
Christoph Heemann - synthesizer, electronics

Production
 Jason Ward - mastering
 Sean Dack - artwork
 Greg Norman - recording
 Mike Hagler - recording

References

External links 
 

2009 debut albums
Locrian (band) albums